Andre Wells (born 9 November 1994) is a Bahamian sprinter. He attended Florida State University.

He won a gold medal in the 4×400 metre relay at the 2010 Central American and Caribbean Junior Championships.

References

External links
IAAF profile for Andre Wells
Florida State Seminoles bio

1994 births
Living people
Bahamian male sprinters
People from Freeport, Bahamas
Florida State Seminoles men's track and field athletes